Bessude is a comune (municipality) in the Province of Sassari in the Italian region Sardinia, located about  north of Cagliari and about  southeast of Sassari.

Bessude borders the following municipalities: Banari, Bonnanaro, Borutta, Ittiri, Siligo, Thiesi.

References

Cities and towns in Sardinia